Hupsekot is a Rural municipality located within the Nawalpur District of the Gandaki Province of Nepal.
The rural municipality spans  of area, with a total population of 25,065 according to a 2011 Nepal census.

On March 10, 2017, the Government of Nepal restructured the local level bodies into 753 new local level structures.
The previous Hupsekot, Dhobadi and Deurali VDCs were merged to form Hupsekot Rural Municipality.
Hupsekot is divided into 6 wards, with Deurali declared the administrative center of the rural municipality. Thumki Devi Temple is a major attraction of Hupsekot.Koliya is the central of Hupsekot and Ashwin Sigdel has been named head of the place.

References

External links
official website of the rural municipality

Rural municipalities in Nawalpur District
Rural municipalities of Nepal established in 2017